A Reason to Swim is the third EP of singer/songwriter Joe Brooks and is his first independent release following his departure from Lava Records/Universal Republic Records. It was released through Fantastic Music LLC in the US on September 6, 2011.

History
A Reason to Swim is the fourth overall release of artist Joe Brooks and his third EP.  Following being dropped from Lava Records/Universal Republic Records in early 2011 Brooks quickly began putting together music for an EP release. To fund the album independently Brooks started a threshold pledge system through the site PledgeMusic. Designated the "Fans Only EP", people who pledged money were able to receive signed memorabilia, access to Joe Brooks concerts or even a prom date with Brooks. Funding for the album exceeded its goal, with additional money going toward the filming of the music video "Holes Inside." "Holes Inside" was released on YouTube a day after the album, on September 7.

The EP was licensed and released by Sony in Korea and Malaysia. As part of the promotion, Brooks attended a media tour in Korea to support A Reason to Swim, appearing on national television and Korean publications of Nylon and Teen Vogue. The song "Someday (OK)" was also featured on Superstar K3.

Track listing

Personnel

Musicians
 Joe Brooks: Vocals, Acoustic Guitar (all tracks) String Arrangement (track 4)
 Rune Westberg: Electric Guitar, Bass, Programming (tracks 1,5,6)
 Mikal Blue: Bass (tracks 2,4,5) String Arrangement (track 4)
 Eric Nelson: (track 2)
 Billy Hawn: Guitar (track 2)
 Matt Mayhall: (track 3)
 Stuart Brawley: Rhodes, Harp, Organ, Strings (track 3)
 Adam Hamilton: Bass (track 3)
 Joe Corcoran: Horns, Electric Guitar
 Sara Haze: Background Vocals (track 4)
 Victor Indrizzo: Drums (track 4)
 David Levita: Guitars (track 4)
 Kevin Daniel: Piano (track 4)
 Fredrick Bokkenheuser: Drums (track 5)

Production
 Mikal Blue: Producer
 Rune Westberg: Producer
 Stuart Brawley: Producer
 Jess Sojka: Engineer
 Joe Yannece: Mastering
 Joe Corcoran: Digital Editing
 Ehud Kaldes: Engineer
 Ken Krongard: Management
 Reid Hunter: Legal
 Joe Brooks: Art Direction, Design, Cover Art
 Felicia Simion: Cover Photography
 Shane Fabila: Inside Photography

References

2011 EPs
Albums produced by Mikal Blue
Joe Brooks (singer) EPs